is a railway station located in the city of Kuki, Saitama, Japan, operated by the private railway operator Tōbu Railway. The station is numbered "TN-03".

Lines

Station layout
This station consists of two island platforms serving four tracks, with an elevated station building located above the tracks and platforms. Platforms 2 and 3 are on passing loops.

Platforms

Adjacent stations

History
Minami-Kurihashi Station opened on 26 August 1986.

From 17 March 2012, station numbering was introduced on all Tōbu lines, with Minami-Kurihashi Station becoming "TN-03".

Passenger statistics
In fiscal 2019, the station was used by an average of 8843 passengers daily (boarding passengers only).

Surrounding area
 
Minami-Kurihashi Post Office

See also
 List of railway stations in Japan

References

External links

  

Railway stations in Saitama Prefecture
Stations of Tobu Railway
Tobu Nikko Line
Railway stations in Japan opened in 1986
Kuki, Saitama